Jakiw "Jakob" Palij (Yah-keev PAH’-lee; ; 16 August 1923 – 10 January 2019) was a Polish-born Ukrainian who served in the SS and as a guard in the Nazi Trawniki concentration camp during World War II. He eventually became an American citizen and lived most of his life in the United States until he was stripped of his citizenship and deported to Germany at the age of 95.

Early life
Jakiw Palij was born on 16 August 1923 in the village of Piadyki, in what was then Stanisławów Voivodeship, eastern Poland and is now in the Ivano-Frankivsk Oblast of western Ukraine. At the outbreak of World War II, in 1939, Soviet troops moved in to occupy his home village, along with other Polish territory, in accordance with the terms of the Molotov–Ribbentrop Pact. In June 1941, when the Germans attacked the Soviet Union, the village was captured by the Nazi troops.

Wartime service

After occupying Poland, Germany built labor camps in the country, one of which was run by the SS in Trawniki. The camp initially served as an Auffanglager für Flüchtlinge, a holding center for refugees, and then turned into the SS-Ausbildungslager-Trawniki training facility. There, Ukrainian volunteers were trained by the SS and then enlisted as auxiliaries, colloquially called Hiwis.

Trawniki became an Operation Reinhard extermination camp and mass executions of prisoners were undertaken there too, committed mostly by the Ukrainian Hiwis, as well as by Germans. At each of these camps, Trawniki Hiwis served as the Sonderkommando guard units. They also acted as gas chambers operators. Almost all Trawniki guards were involved in shooting, beating, and terrorizing Jews. The Russian historian Sergei Kudryashov, who made a study of the Trawniki men serving at death camps, claimed that there was little sign among them of attraction to National Socialism ideals and that most had volunteered in order to leave the POW camps and/or because of self-interest. On the other hand, Holocaust historian Christopher R. Browning wrote that Hiwis "were screened on the basis of their anti-Communist beliefs and hence almost invariably were anti-Semites."

According to documents presented subsequently in his deportation trials, Palij served in the Streibel Battalion, guarding forced laborers who made uniforms and brushes. On 3 November 1943, an estimated 6,000 Jews at the camp were executed in a single day, a mass murder rated by Browning to have been "the largest killing operation against Jews in the entire war."

Emigration to the United States
After Germany's defeat in 1945, Palij stayed in Poland. On 30 April 1948, another Piadyki-born Ukrainian camp guard, listed in Soviet military records as Nikolaj Gutsulyak or Mykola Hutsulyak, revealed to the Soviet authorities that he had served with Palij at the Trawniki extermination camp. In early 1949, and not having yet been traced by the Soviets, Palij, without disclosing his wartime service as an SS-auxiliary, submitted a request to the US Displaced Persons Commission asking to be designated a "displaced person" eligible to emigrate to the United States. He provided the American authorities with a false timeline of his life during the war, claiming he had worked on his father's farm in Piadyki, and that he subsequently worked in a farm and a factory in Germany.

Palij obtained the requested visa and, traveling from Bremerhaven, Germany, on the Gen. Heintzelman, a US military-transport ship, arrived in the Boston Harbor in July 1949. On the same vessel were also two other men who would be subsequently hunted by American officials for their wartime activities. Palij was employed as a draftsman at the New York office of Johnson Controls.

Deportation to Germany
In 1993, investigators from the U.S Justice Department's Human Rights and Special Prosecution Section claimed they found the name of Jakiw Palij in an old Nazi roster. A fellow former guard was contacted, and testified that Palij was "living somewhere in America." The investigators located him in Queens, New York City, where he was working as a draftsman and living in a "second-story apartment in a modest red-brick duplex" with his wife Maria, who had since died, an apartment that was "unwittingly" sold to him by a Holocaust survivor. In 2001, Palij admitted to the American authorities that he had lied in his original request for emigration to the States. In 2003, his American citizenship was revoked, and in 2004, a federal judge issued an order of deportation against him. In his decisions, issued on 10 June and 23 August 2004, U.S. Immigration Judge Robert Owens ordered Palij's deportation to "Ukraine, Poland or Germany, or any other country that would admit him," on the basis of his "participation in Nazi-sponsored acts of persecution while serving during World War II as an armed guard at the Trawniki forced-labor camp in Nazi-occupied Poland under the direction of the government of Germany and his subsequent concealment of that service when he immigrated to the United States." Judge Owens wrote also that the Jews massacred at Trawniki "had spent at least half a year in camps guarded by Trawniki-trained men, including Jakiw Palij." In December 2005, the Board of Immigration Appeals denied Palij's appeal. Palij, in his court filings, repeatedly denied any wrongdoing, claiming that he and other young men from his home village were "coerced" into working for the "Nazi occupiers."

According to subsequent State Department statements, "difficult conversations" ensued between the United States and the three European countries to which he could be sent, Germany, Poland, or Ukraine, since none of them would concede to accept Palij.

In 2015, the Würzburg public prosecutor's office in Germany undertook a preliminary investigation on Palij, and a formal one in July 2016 but subsequently announced that the evidence against the suspect was "insufficient to accuse him of complicity in murder." During the time his deportation was pending, Palij continued to live in his Jackson Heights apartment in New York City, in front of which protests and demonstrations against his presence there were taking place regularly. Palij stated to the media that he had "become used to the protests", and did not expect any country to accept "an 80-year-old man in poor health."

In 2018, the German government approved Palij's entry into the country, its representative stating that the decision was taken "although the former guard of a Nazi labor camp was never a German citizen" and that "there [had been] no evidence that he was involved in Nazi crimes." Foreign Minister Heiko Maas said to the media:We face the moral obligation of Germany, in whose name the worst injustice was done under the Nazis. The task that grows for us from our history includes coming to terms with and honestly dealing with the crimes of the Nazi reign of terror. This also includes the compass of our Basic Law with the unconditional priority of human dignity and responsibility for the rule of law. On the basis of this belief, we take responsibility towards the victims of National Socialism as well as our international partners - even if this sometimes demands difficult political considerations.

On 21 August 2018, ICE agents raided the Palij residence in Queens, apprehended the 95-year-old deportee, and put him on a US government-chartered air ambulance that departed from Teterboro Airport, New Jersey, and took its passengers to Dusseldorf, Germany, arriving there early in the morning at local time. The German government announced that Palij would reside in a retirement home in the town of Ahlen.

The US authorities subsequently declared that Palij had been the last known Nazi suspect living in the United States.

Death
On 10 January 2019, it was announced that Palij, a resident of the Ahlen care facility since his arrival in Germany, had died that morning "from natural causes", at the age of 95.

See also
John Demjanjuk
List of denaturalized former citizens of the United States

Notes

References

External links
Human Rights and Special Prosecution Section at the U.S Justice Department's official website

1923 births
2019 deaths
Polish expatriates in the United States
Internment camps
Universal jurisdiction
Ukrainian collaborators with Nazi Germany
Ukrainian expatriates in the United States
Nazi concentration camp personnel
Nazi war criminals
Loss of United States citizenship by prior Nazi affiliation